Duck family may refer to:
 A familial grouping for a duck, i.e. a drake and a female and their ducklings
 Anatidae, the scientific taxonomic family that ducks are classified under
 Duck family (Disney), the fictional family of cartoon ducks related to Donald Duck